Shopian Assembly constituency is one of the 87 constituencies in the Jammu and Kashmir Legislative Assembly of Jammu and Kashmir a north state of India. Shopian is also part of Anantnag Lok Sabha constituency.

Members of the Legislative Assembly

Election results

2014

See also 

 Shopian
 List of constituencies of Jammu and Kashmir Legislative Assembly

References 

Assembly constituencies of Jammu and Kashmir
Shopian district